Aulne is a river of Brittany in north-western France.

Aulne may also refer to:

 Aulne Abbey, a Cistercian monastery in Belgium
 Aulne, Kansas, an unincorporated community in the United States